George Bernard Newport (29 March 1876 – 12 July 1953) played first-class cricket for Somerset in 1902 and 1904. He was born at Muttum, in India and died at Wonford, Exeter, Devon. 

Newport was a lower-order right-handed batsman and a wicketkeeper. He played one match in 1902 against Gloucestershire at Bath and scored 11 and 16 in his two innings, as well as taking three catches. His only other appearance was a 12-a-side first-class match against Oxford University in 1904 in which he failed to score in either innings and took just one catch.

References

1876 births
1953 deaths
English cricketers
Somerset cricketers
British people in colonial India